Glentoran Football Club is a professional football club that plays in the NIFL Premiership. The club was founded in 1882. The club have won over 130 major honours making them one of the most successful football clubs in the world.

History

Early history
In 1914, Glentoran won the Vienna Cup, becoming the first United Kingdom and Ireland team to win a European trophy, although as this competition took place several decades before the formation of UEFA, it is not recognised as such.

1960s
George Best watched Glentoran with his grandfather as a youth, but was rejected by the club for being "too small and light". However, Best did make one appearance for Glentoran, in the club's centenary match against Manchester United.

In 1964–65, Glentoran faced Panathinaikos in the European Cup and drew 2–2 at home and lost 3–2 away. In the following season's Fairs Cup, they faced Antwerp resulting a 1–0 defeat away and 3–3 draw at home. The Cup-Winners' Cup in 1966–67 saw Glentoran draw 1–1 with Rangers in front of a packed Oval before losing the away leg 4–0.

Glentoran's finest hour came in a European Cup encounter with Benfica in 1967. The tie was played over two legs, the first being at the Oval. Glentoran scored a penalty early on and held out for nearly sixty minutes until football great Eusébio equalised. The match ended 1–1. The return tie was at Benfica's Estádio da Luz. Part-time Glentoran were expected to crumble under the pressure of the occasion, but again held out for a famous 0–0 draw. Benfica advanced to the next round on the away goals rule. Glentoran were the first team to lose out to this rule and the first team to stop Benfica scoring at home.

In 1967, the club ran the Detroit Cougars football franchise in the United Soccer Association. The newly formed league had planned for an inaugural season in 1968, but when the rival National Professional Soccer League announced a start date of 1967 and a television contract with CBS, the league owners decided to fast track their league by importing entire squads from Europe and South America. The two leagues would eventually merge and form the North American Soccer League the following year.

1970s
In 1973–74, Glentoran reached the quarter-finals of the Cup-Winners' Cup. They faced Borussia Mönchengladbach in the quarter-finals and were beaten 2–0 and 5–0. Four seasons later they faced Juventus in a European Cup match and lost 1–0 at home (Warren Feeney missing a late penalty) and 5–0 away.

1980s
In 1981–82, Glentoran reached the second round of the European Cup and faced eventual semi-finalists CSKA Sofia. After a 2–0 defeat away, Glentoran went 2–0 up in the return leg to force the game into extra time. The final result was 2–1, Glentoran going out 3–2 on aggregate.

The 1985 Irish Cup final between the "Big Two" saw another famous incident. Glentoran supporters brought a cockerel, the club's emblem, to the match and a pig, painted in royal blue colour, the colour of bitter rivals, Linfield. The two animals stayed on the sidelines for the duration of the match. Glentoran fans also brought a cockerel to the 2006 Irish Cup final, it too stayed on the sidelines for the duration, Glentoran lost the game 2–1, thus ending their unbeaten post-war record against Linfield in Irish Cup finals. This run of 5 victories over Linfield in post-war finals which started in 1966 continued until Glentoran's defeat in the 2006 final.

1990s
In 1995 Glentoran played their traditional Boxing Day match against Linfield on a snow-covered pitch. In the first half the orange ball was damaged, and not having a replacement the teams were forced to play with a white ball for the remainder of the game. The incident was used as a "What Happened Next" question on the BBC's A Question of Sport.

Former Linfield manager Roy Coyle took charge of the club in 1997 and under his stewardship the club entered another period of success. In Coyle's first cup final in charge he gave up the right to lead the team out, instead he asked long serving Kitman Teddy Horner have this honour.

2000s
The 2002–03 season was one of the club's most successful in recent times. Of a potential four trophies, Glentoran won three, capturing the Irish League championship, Irish League Cup and County Antrim Shield but fell at the final hurdle, losing the Irish Cup Final 1–0 to Coleraine.  The only Irish League to complete the clean sweep of all trophies is Linfield who have achieved this on 3 occasions. They won 7 trophies in 1921–22 and 7 in 1961–62 and also 4 trophies in 1955–56.  To come so close to a clean sweep in 2003 and fail was a bitter pill to swallow.

On 23 April 2005, Glentoran defeated their rivals Linfield in the second last game but one of the league season. In the 93rd minute of the match, Glentoran, who needed victory in order to have a chance of clinching the league title, scored a goal via their centre forward (and former Linfield player) Chris Morgan. There were confrontations between the two sets of fans following the match. Hooliganism was commonplace at matches between the clubs in the past. However this has reduced significantly in recent years.

Roy Coyle won 16 trophies with Glentoran and is the club's most successful manager in the club's history.

Financial troubles (2011–2019)

Millar (2006–2007)
After eight years in charge of Glentoran, Roy Coyle resigned as manager after a string of indifferent results. On 14 February 2006 the club announced that former Newry City manager Paul Millar was to take over the manager's position. Since taking over, performances improved and he led his team into the Irish Cup final with rivals Linfield. Despite taking the lead in the first half, Linfield won the game with two goals from Peter Thompson. He also led his new club to their biggest ever defeat against their cross-city rivals Linfield in a 6–0 defeat at Windsor Park. The Glens had sought to reduce the gap between them and Linfield by signing Kyle Neill and Gary Hamilton from Portadown and re-signing former fan's favourite Gary Smyth. Also arriving was another former player, Jason Hill, former Portadown and Newry City player Cullen Feeney and promising young keeper Ciaran McLaughlin from Ards.

Paul Millar was sacked as manager on 17 May 2007 after less than fifteen months in the job, having steered the club to two successive seasons finishing second in the League behind Linfield. He had the backing of chairman Stafford Reynolds, but the majority of the board and fans wanted his departure. The start of his second season in charge had looked promising. As Glentoran led the league summit, they were five points clear of Linfield at Christmas. Arguably ten minutes of football wrecked what looked to be a very successful campaign. Glentoran were leading Portadown 2 – 1 with eighty-five minutes gone. Two late goals sealed Glentoran's first defeat of the season and ultimately led to successive defeats, and the slight climax (8–0 vs. Armagh City). Fans were disappointed with the style of football displayed by the team in the later months of Millar's reign.

McDonald (2007–2010)
On 24 May 2007 former Crusaders and Glenavon manager Roy Walker was appointed as Glentoran manager along with assistant manager Billy Sinclair. Walker previously led Crusaders to two league titles in 1995 and 1997. After leaving football management for seven years, Walker became a football analyst with BBC Radio Ulster. He was quoted as saying, "Glentoran were my boyhood team and are probably the only club which could have attracted me back."

However, on 26 May 2007 it was revealed that Walker would not be able to take up the post, due to not possessing the necessary UEFA coaching qualifications.

Less than one week later Glentoran appointed head coach Alan McDonald as manager. Roy Walker gracefully walked away but stated in the Belfast Telegraph that he would not rest until director of football Tom Dick stood down. Mr Dick then did so, but also criticised the club chairman Stafford Reynolds. Reynolds confirmed that he would step down if the right person could be found to take over. Alan McDonald, the new manager, had so far secured former Glentoran player Rory Hamill, Daryl Fordyce from Portsmouth, winger Jamie McGovern from West Bromwich Albion and Dungannon Swifts winger David Scullion and has re-signed Chris Morgan and Tim McCann. Darren Lockhart left the club at the time to join Crusaders on a one-year loan deal along with defender Gary Smith. In January Glentoran managed to bring in Shane Mcabe from Dungannon and Darren Boyce from Coleraine.

Alan McDonald won two trophies with The Glens and also led the Glens to the final of the Setanta Cup. In McDonald's first season as manager, Glentoran defeated Crusaders in the County Antrim Shield final. The next season, Glentoran won the league after a strong race with Linfield. Glentoran finished three successive seasons, 2006–2008, as runners-up to three times Double Champions Linfield. Since then, notable signings at the club include Matthew Burrows, from Dundela (where he scored fifty-three goals last term), Johnny Taylor (from Hearts) and former Lisburn Distillery player Andy Waterworth for a fee of £30,000. Glentoran's build up to the season included friendlies against Hearts, Burnley and Ipswich Town. However, Glentoran's start to the season was delayed by a referee strike led by their association's Chairman, David Malcolm, citing higher wage demands. This ultimately postponed all week one fixtures. The following week, in the game against Glenavon, Glentoran's pitch was declared unplayable.  Matches against Bangor and then Linfield were cancelled, and this led to Glentoran facing Bangor in the first Irish League game to be played on a Sunday. The historic scoreline was 1–0.

Glentoran also unexpectedly reached the final of the Setanta Sports Cup 2008, a cup in which the top four clubs from both the Irish League and League of Ireland play each other.  Glentoran defeated Linfield with a 4–1 win, making the group a more open competition. This was followed up by a 1–0 win in a home match again St. Patrick's Athletic. In the final on 13 October 2008, Glentoran were defeated by League of Ireland side Cork City 2–1 at Turners Cross. On 2 May 2009 Glentoran won the first ever Irish Premiership by defeating Cliftonville 3–1 at The Oval. This was their first league title since a 2005 win, ending Linfield's 3-year dominance on all fronts. Alan McDonald would in the coming weeks sign a new 2-year contract with the club after much speculation, keeping him there until 2011. Glentoran's only summer signings for 2009 were Richard Clarke from Newry City and Northern Ireland international Keith Gillespie on a free transfer.

Young (2010–2012)

In March 2010, after McDonald resigned, former player Scott Young was put in charge of the Glens until the end of the 2010–11 season along with Pete Batey as assistant manager and Tim McCann as head coach. Young led Glentoran into the 2009–10 Irish League Cup final against Coleraine. The bannsiders were the favourites for the match but the Glens were the team who came out victorious, winning 4–1 on penalties after the match ended in a 2–2 draw. At the end of the season, Young along with Batey and McCann signed a deal with the Glens to stay on as manager. Former Glentoran manager Roy Coyle, who brought a huge amount of success, became director of football.

Young released some of the club's higher-profile players, including Michael Halliday and Keith Gillespie. Halliday joined North Belfast side Crusaders. Kyle Neill also left the club and joined Glenavon. Dean Fitzgerald and Shane McCabe were also among the players released.

Gary Hamilton went out on loan to Glenavon, and back in December 2011 took on the role as manager of the club (after the resignation of Marty Quinn), after being released of his playing obligations by Glentoran. During Young's first season as manager, Glentoran's financial difficulties escalated, until HMRC issued Glentoran a winding-up order, and gave the club until the beginning of January 2011 to clear all outstanding debts which totalled over £300,000. A fundraising organisation, Spirit of '41 (which was named after the year when The Oval was bombed by Germans and the massive effort to rebuild it) was set up, and to this day has raised over £25,000. On 12 January 2011, a special EGM was held which set out the proposals that would save Glentoran from oblivion and change radically how the club is run. The vote was passed unanimously with the condition that 3 new board members were added, including a new chairman, and the previous chairman stepped down to vice-chairman.

On 5 October 2010, Glentoran player Matty Burrows scored a backheel goal against Portadown, which won Burrows the ESPN goal of the season and Sky Sports goal of the season. The goal also achieved millions of views on YouTube and went up against world-famous player Lionel Messi for the FIFA goal of the season award. Burrows narrowly lost out on the award with many saying he did not win because he wasn't a high-profile player.

On 7 July 2011, Glentoran beat Macedonian side FK Renova in the Europa League first qualifying round after the Glens overturned a 2–1 away defeat by winning the home leg 2–1 at The Oval and thus levelling the score on aggregate. The match was decided by penalties. Glentoran progressed after winning the shoot-out 3–2.

Young started his second season very well, with a 2–1 win away to Crusaders. However, the 2011–12 season would turn out to be disappointing for Young and the club. Rory Patterson was set to come back at the club, but could not agree on the contract following the finance problems. Patterson joined Glentoran's bitter rivals Linfield. However, Matty Burrows returned to the club, but struggled to maintain his place. The club then started to go through a run of poor results and started to lose supporters. Despite beating Linfield three times, Glentoran lost in the County Antrim Shield final to Cliftonville and continued their losing streak in the league. On 14 January 2012, Glentoran were knocked out of the 2011–12 Irish Cup by Amateur league side Newington Youth Club. Young then resigned after the game. Director of Football Roy Coyle was put in charge for the match against Ballymena United.

Patterson (2012–2015)

Former Lisburn Distillery boss Paul Kirk, former Crusaders and Ballymena United boss Roy Walker, former Cliftonville boss Eddie Patterson, and former Coleraine boss Marty Quinn were among the possible contenders for the job including former player Pat McGibbon and Ian Foster. Walker and Patterson applied for the job along with McGibbon and Foster on 1 February 2012. Patterson was appointed manager of the club on Wednesday 22 February 2012. Glentoran finished the 2011–12 league season in 6th place, a massive 28 points behind the league champions; cross-city rivals Linfield. However, some consolation came from the fact that they beat Linfield in all four league meetings between the sides that season, without conceding a goal in the process.

During the summer of 2012, Patterson made several signings such as Marcus Kane, Jay Magee and Mark Clarke. The Glens started the 2012–13 season well with a 3–1 victory over Donegal Celtic. This was followed by three consecutive 1–1 draws against Glenavon, Cliftonville and Linfield. One day before the game against Linfield, the club announced the signing of Stuart Elliott, who was returning to the club where he made his name before moving across the water to play for Hull City, Motherwell and Hamilton Academical. Glentoran defeated Ballinamallard United 4–1 and Dungannon Swifts 3–1 in the space of a week, pushing them up to second in the league. The Glens then secured a 0–0 home draw against Coleraine in a top of the table clash before defeating Lisburn Distillery 3–0 a week later. A 1–1 draw against Ballymena United at the Showgrounds made it nine league games unbeaten from the start of the season.

However, the unbeaten run came to an end in the next game when Crusaders won 2–0 at Seaview on 6 October 2012, just 5 days after an enthralling County Antrim Shield quarter-final defeat against Linfield which saw three goals in the final minutes of the game, ending 3–2 to Linfield. One week after the Crusaders loss, Glentoran was beaten for the second successive league game (their first home loss of the season), when Portadown won 1–0 at The Oval.

The club's financial problems would soon come to light again. In November 2012 it was reported that the squad had refused to train because they had not received their wages for two months. If the problem continued, it may have reached the stage where the players would have the right to be released from their contracts. Back on the field, the club had mixed results in the next six league games. Three wins, a draw, and two defeats which included a disappointing 2–1 loss away to Donegal Celtic, left the Glens sitting in fifth place in the league at the end of November, twelve points behind pacesetters Cliftonville.

The 2012–13 league campaign ultimately ended with the club finishing fourth in the table. However, the season ended on a high note as the Glens overcame favourites and newly crowned league champions Cliftonville 3–1 after extra time in the Irish Cup final on 4 May 2013. This was the club's first Irish Cup win in nine years.

In the 2014–15 Season Glentoran won another Irish cup against Portadown and the 2nd under Eddie Patterson. The game was played at The Oval because construction work at Windsor park had gone wrong and the Kop stand was deemed unstable and needed to be knocked down. The game finished 1–0 after a very wet afternoon in East Belfast.

After defeating Carrick Rangers 2–0 at home, Eddie Patterson was sacked. Former manager Roy Coyle took over for the next game as caretaker boss.

Kernaghan (2015–2016)
On 9 November 2015 Alan Kernaghan was appointed as Glentoran manager.
Kernaghan started with some promising results and managed to end the 2015/16 season in 5th Position.The Glens made several signings that summer in the hope of returning to the top 3 and returning to regular European football signing included former Ballymena United goalkeeper Dwayne Nelson, Portadown defender Ross Redman, resigned former player James Ferrin, Eric Foley from Galway United and the signing of Rangers Spanish legend Nacho Novo the Glens started the season inconsistently with two 1–0 wins against Dungannon Swifts and Portadown and two defeats against Cliftonville and struggling Carrick Rangers. The pressure starting to mount on Kernaghan was severely increased when they were beaten 4–1 by Coleraine with many thinking the writing was on the wall for Kernaghan reign as manager and following a shock 3–2 League Cup defeat to Championship side Annagh United, Kernaghan resigned as manager of Glentoran.

Haveron (2016–2018)
Gary Haveron became manager on 28 September 2016. In January 2017, Glentoran suffered a 2–1 Irish Cup 5th Round defeat at the Oval to fierce rivals Linfield after extra time. Haveron was sacked by the club on 21 February 2018, following a 2–1 defeat to Ards at the Oval, with the club citing his performances were not good enough. The team was sixth in the league at that stage. Haveron did, however, lead the Glens to a 2017 Boxing Day victory, beating Linfield 2–1.

McFall (2018–2019)
Following Haverons dismissal, Glentoran reappointed Ronnie McFall as manager. A management reshuffle was announced which saw Gary Smyth become his assistant manager and Paul Leeman become a coach at the club. Kieran Harding was also an assistant to McFall. McFalls second spell proved unsuccessful. McFall left the club on 3 January 2019. At that point, the team were 9th in the league table, 5 points above the relegation zone.

Smyth (2019)
Gary Smyth became the caretaker manager of Glentoran on 3 January 2019. His first match was a 4–1 defeat to Crusaders in the Irish Cup. Paul Leeman was his assistant, with Kieran Harding, who was assistant to McFall becoming a coach. The months after saw an improvement in form. Smyth, who did not hold the required coaching qualifications to lead the club into the playoffs or UEFA competition was replaced on 31 March 2019, the deadline day for UEFA Licensing by Mick McDermott.

New ownership and management (2019–)
Mick McDermott became manager as a part of a deal which involved a group of investors putting finance into Glentoran. An EGM was held on 16 May 2019 for shareholders to vote on the proposal. 96% of shareholders approved the investment. Paul Millar rejoined the club as Mick McDermott's assistant manager. Kieran Harding remained as a coach, however Gary Smyth and Paul Leeman were not seen in the dug-out for the following matches. On 21 May 2019, Glentoran announced Smyth had left the club, a controversial decision amongst some fans. Leeman left two days later despite both being offered to be retained in the same roles and with the same benefits under the new and correctly qualified management team. 

On 4 February 2020, the Glentoran Chairman Stephen Henderson announced on behalf of the club, that it was finally free of external debt. Once having been £1.77 million in the red, the Board of Directors had cleared 80% of the debt across the decade and prior to the new investment in the club. A combination of the investor and the old board then settled the final remaining debt with the last outstanding creditor.

During McDermott's first full season in charge at the East Belfast club, he and Millar led the side to victory in the Irish Cup final on 31 July 2020. Glentoran defeated Ballymena United 2–1 in the final after extra-time, with goals coming from Paul O'Neill and Robbie McDaid.

McDermott was replaced by Rodney McAree on 17 January 2023.

Stadium and redevelopment

In March 2003, the club's board of directors advised the shareholders of Glentoran Recreation Company Ltd to sell the Oval to a property development holding company called Girona. To date, no new ground has materialised. A campaign waged by a group of volunteer supporters called Rest In East, was then set up to keep the club in east Belfast. The club's Board of directors have suggested moving close to a town called Comber, well outside the city bounds of Belfast, which the majority of supporters firmly oppose.

On 3 November 2005 a fans forum voted 417–0 in favour of forming Glentoran Community Trust, the first supporters' trust to be formed in Northern Ireland. It was officially formed on 15 May 2006 and registered with the Registry of Companies Belfast under the Industrial and Provident Societies Acts 1965–1978. The trust sits completely independent of the parent club, giving the ordinary non-shareholding supporter a voice. On 29 January 2008, the GCT took another historic step, when one of its members, Stephen Henderson was elected to the board of directors by the shareholders of Glentoran FC, with the most votes ever gained in an election. This would prove an important step for the club during the financial crisis that would soon engulf it.

On 12 January 2011, a resolution was passed that gives the GCT two permanent board members.
Recently, Glentoran formed a strategic alliance partnership with Insaka AFC, the football club of the African Youth Diaspora in the Irish Republic by forming Insaka-Glentoran Football Academy at the same time becoming the first club on the island of Ireland to adopt a whole club approach to the UEFA 'Respect' campaign.

On 24 May 2016, supporters approved a board recommendation, at the club end of season AGM, to demolish and redevelop The Oval into a modern new community-based stadium, over alternative proposed moves to sites at Sydenham and Titanic Quarter. Funding will come from a £10million amount that has been on hold for the Glens under the Government's £110m sports grounds improvement programme that has led to the creation of the new Windsor Park and Ulster Rugby's Kingspan Stadium in tandem with redevelopment at venues across the country.

European record

Overview

Matches

UEFA ranking

Players

Current squad

Out on loan

Under 20 squad

Academy
Glentoran runs the Glentoran Academy, to help promote football to younger players. It is the fastest growing football academy in the country and includes players, both boys and girls from the age of 4. The Academy also includes a disability section and a Polish language section, where playing for the team requires attendance at training and at English language classes. In 2015–16, the club had 44 players representing Northern Ireland at different age groups, twice as many as any other club. In the summer of 2016, 4 more players left the academy to take up places at English professional clubs academies. The Academy was set up in June 2008.

Managerial history
See .
List only counts permanent managers.
 Sam Jennings (1936–38)
 Louis Page (1939–40)
 Frank Thompson (1945–47)
 Frank Grice (1948–55)
 Jimmy McIntosh (1955–57)
 Ken Chisholm (1958)
 Tommy Briggs (1959–60)
 Alex Young (1968)
 Peter McParland (1968–71)
 Kieran Dowd (1971/72)
 Alex McCrae (1972)
 George Eastham Sr. (1972–74)
 Arthur Stewart (1977–78)
 Ronnie McFall (1979–84)
 Billy Johnston (1985–87)
 Tommy Jackson (1987–93)
 Robert Strain (1993/94)
 Tommy Cassidy (1994–97)
 Roy Coyle (1997–2006)
 Paul Millar (2006–07)
 Alan McDonald (2007–10)
 Scott Young (2010–12)
 Eddie Patterson (26 February 2012 – 17 October 2015)
 Alan Kernaghan (9 November 2015 – 30 August 2016)
 Gary Haveron (28 September 2016 – 21 February 2018)
 Ronnie McFall (22 February 2018 – 3 January 2019)
 Gary Smyth (3 January 2019 – 31 March 2019)
 Mick McDermott (1 April 2019 – 17 January 2023)
 Rodney McAree (17 January 2023 – Present)

Honours

Active Competitions

Senior honours (81)
Irish League/Irish Premier League/IFA Premiership: 23
1893–94, 1896–97, 1904–05, 1911–12, 1912–13, 1920–21, 1924–25, 1930–31, 1950–51, 1952–53, 1963–64, 1966–67, 1967–68, 1969–70, 1971–72, 1976–77, 1980–81, 1987–88, 1991–92, 1998–99, 2002–03, 2004–05, 2008–09
Irish Cup: 23
1913–14, 1916–17, 1920–21, 1931–32, 1932–33, 1934–35, 1950–51, 1965–66, 1972–73, 1982–83, 1984–85, 1985–86, 1986–87, 1987–88, 1989–90, 1995–96, 1997–98, 1999–00, 2000–01, 2003–04, 2012–13, 2014–15, 2019–20
Irish League Cup: 7
1988–89, 1990–91, 2000–01, 2002–03, 2004–05, 2006–07, 2009–10
County Antrim Shield: 26
1900–01, 1901–02, 1910–11, 1915–16, 1917–18, 1924–25, 1930–31, 1939–40, 1940–41, 1943–44, 1949–50, 1950–51, 1951–52, 1956–57, 1967–68, 1970–71, 1977–78, 1984–85, 1986–87, 1998–99, 1999–00, 2000–01, 2001–02, 2002–03, 2007–08, 2010–11Charity Shield: 21992 (shared with Glenavon), 2015

Defunct Competitions

Senior Honours (53)Gold Cup: 141916–17, 1951–52, 1960–61, 1962–63, 1966–67, 1976–77, 1977–78, 1982–83, 1986–87, 1991–92, 1994–95, 1998–99, 1999–00, 2000–01City Cup: 151896–97, 1898–99, 1910–11, 1911–12, 1913–14, 1914–15, 1931–32, 1950–51, 1952–53, 1956–57, 1964–65, 1966–67, 1969–70, 1972–73, 1974–75Ulster Cup: 91950–51, 1952–53, 1966–67, 1976–77, 1981–82, 1982–83, 1983–84, 1988–89, 1989–90Belfast Charity Cup: 81895–96, 1901–02, 1906–07, 1910–11, 1922–23, 1924–25, 1925–26 (shared), 1928–29 (shared) Floodlit Cup: 21987–88, 1989–90County Antrim Centenary Chalice: 11987–88Substitute Gold Cup: 11941–42

All-Ireland honoursBlaxnit Cup: 11972–73Inter-City Cup: 11943–44

European HonoursVienna Cup: 11913–14

Intermediate honoursCounty Antrim Shield: 11908-09Irish League B Division: 11958–59†Irish Intermediate League: 41915–16†, 1918–19†, 1919–20†, 1929–30†B Division Section 2/Reserve League: 81985–86†, 1986–87†, 1989–90†, 1992–93†, 1995–96†, 1997–98†, 2001–02†, 2002–03†Irish Intermediate Cup: 91893–94†, 1897–98†, 1908–09†, 1912–13†, 1915–16†, 1917–18†, 1930–31†, 1940–41†, 1961–62†George Wilson Cup: 111965–66†, 1966–67†, 1979–80†, 1986–87†, 2000–01†, 2001–02†, 2002–03†, 2004–05†, 2009–10†, 2011–12†, 2013–14†Steel & Sons Cup: 131904–05†, 1908–09†, 1910–11†, 1914–15†, 1918–19†, 1932–33†, 1937–38†, 1957–58†, 1965–66†, 1966–67†, 1989–90†, 2000–01†, 2001–02†McElroy Cup: 41915–16†, 1917–18†, 1933–34† (shared), 1938–39†

† Won by Glentoran II (reserve team)

Junior honours
 Irish Junior League: 6 1896–97†, 1897–98†, 1901–02†, 1904–05†, 1908–09†, 1909–10†Irish Junior Cup: 1'''
1889–90†

† Won by Glentoran II (reserve team)

References

External links
 Official Website
 Glentoran Community Trust – the first ever Supporters Trust in Northern Ireland
 BallymacGSC.com – Popular Supporters Club Website & Away Bus Information
 Glentoran Statistics and Results at the Irish Football Club Project

 
Association football clubs established in 1882
United Soccer Association imported teams
Association football clubs in Northern Ireland
NIFL Premiership clubs
Association football clubs in Belfast
1882 establishments in Ireland
Unrelegated association football clubs